"Great Spirit" is a song by Dutch disc jockey and producer Armin van Buuren in collaboration with Israeli producers duo Vini Vici. It features vocals from the French band Hilight Tribe. It is the first psy trance song by Armin van Buuren. The track was released in the Netherlands by Armind as a digital download on 12 December 2016. The song is included in the tracklist of van Buuren's performance The Best of Armin Only.

Background and release 
Armin van Buuren declared about the song: “I’ve wanted to work with Vini Vici ever since they embarked on the music scene. Few acts have such a well-defined signature sound and I am really pleased with how ‘Great Spirit’ turned out. I’ve been playing this tune in my live sets since Amsterdam Music Festival and they will be thrilled to know that it's finally been released.”

Vini Vici declared about the song: “We believe that hard work, determination and passion can make every dream come true. But this is more than that. We could have never guessed that we’d collaborate with Armin van Buuren and it lly gone beyond our wildest dreams! We are really happy with the results!”

Reception 
According to Wackii from French webmedia Guettapen, "this collaboration is in the mood of the times and takes back all the codes of galloping psy and tribal vocals. [...] Armin's style is not found on this track but he shows one more time his amazing versatility! Nevertheless it is regrettable that the track doesn't really innovate and doesn't really represent a fusion of the styles…"

Track listing 
 Netherlands Digital download 
 "Great Spirit" – 7:37

 Netherlands Digital download 
 "Great Spirit" - 3:36
 "Great Spirit" (Extended Mix) - 7:37

 Netherlands Digital download Wildstylez Remix 
 "Great Spirit" (Wildstylez Extended Remix) – 4:49

Certifications

References 

2016 singles
2016 songs
Armin van Buuren songs
Songs written by Armin van Buuren
Armada Music singles